Air Vice Marshal Graham Skinner,  (born 1945) is a retired Royal Air Force officer.

RAF career
Educated at Hampton School, the University of Bristol and Loughborough University, Skinner joined the Royal Air Force in 1963. He served at Strike Command during the Gulf War and went on to be Director of Logistics Policy and then Director of in-service support for the Tornado and Typhoon programmes before becoming Commander-in-Chief of Logistics Command in September 1999. He left the post in October 1999 on the disbandment of the command. In retirement he became Clerk of the Worshipful Company of Engineers.

Family
In 1969 Skinner married Margaret; they have a son and a daughter.

References

1945 births
Alumni of Loughborough University
Alumni of the University of Bristol
Commanders of the Order of the British Empire
Living people
People educated at Hampton School
Royal Air Force air marshals
Royal Air Force personnel of the Gulf War